"All Over the World" is a 1965 song by the French singer Françoise Hardy.

History 
The song was first recorded (lyrics and music) in French by Françoise Hardy in 1964 under the title "Dans le monde entier", featured on the album Mon amie la rose (catalogue number CLD 699.30). It was released in France in October 1964. Translated into English by Julian More under the title "All Over the World", it was released in the United Kingdom on Single on 12 March 1965 by Pye Records. 
Extended play (EP), in March 1966 by Disques Vogue-Vogue international industries. 
Long Play (LP), Françoise Hardy Sings in English in May 1966 by Disques Vogue-Vogue international industries. 
On March 25, 1965, the song reached the top 50 in the United Kingdom and remained there for 15 weeks (until 8 July — and in the top 20 from April 29 to June 3).
"All Over the World" became one of Hardy's most popular songs and is her best known song in the Anglophone world.

Single track listing
Accompaniment directed by Charles Blackwell orchestra.

UK chart performance
Entry Date: 25 March 1965 (41st)
Highest Position: 16th (3 June: 1965)
Weeks in Chart: 15 Weeks (25 March - 8 July 1965)

EP track listing
Accompaniment directed by Charles Blackwell orchestra.

Cover version 
1965: Zsuzsa Koncz, EP Qualiton, EP 7346
1966: The Seekers, Album, Come the Day, LP EMI, SCX 6093
1967: Noeleen Batley, EP Festival Records, FK 1641
1989: Neoton Familia, Album, Intim Percek, Profil – SLPM 37259
5 March 2012: Katie Melua, CD, Secret Symphony, Dramatico.

Film score 
 April 2009: The Boat That Rocked, written and directed by Richard Curtis

See also
Mon amie la rose
Françoise Hardy Sings in English

References

Françoise Hardy songs
1965 songs
1965 singles
Songs written by Françoise Hardy